Julián Di Cosmo (born December 28, 1984 in Aldao, Santa Fe, Argentina) is an Italian-Argentine association football striker, who currently plays for FAS in the Salvadoran Primera División.

Club career

Early career
Born in, Aldao, Argentina, Di Cosmo began his career in the youth sector of Almirante Brown in Argentina, before transferring to A.C.S.D. Saluzzo in Italy in the summer of 2006. With Saluzzo, Di Cosmo managed 6 goals in 15 appearances for the fifth-tier Italian side, before being sold to Lega Pro Seconda Divisione outfit Igea Virtus prior to the 2007-08 Lega Pro season. He scored 16 league goals in 31 appearances for the Sicilian outfit, winning the Lega Pro Seconda Divisione Capocannoniere (top scorer) that season for his Girone. His performances were often eye-catching, thus impressing scouts of several Serie A and Serie B teams. He eventually completed a transfer to Calcio Catania of the Serie A.

Calcio Catania
Di Cosmo officially transferred to Calcio Catania in July 2008, although he was swiftly loaned out to Lega Pro Prima Divisione side, Paganese Calcio. Di Cosmo scored 2 goals in 16 league appearances before being recalled to Catania in January 2009. He returned to the Italian fourth tier, joining Seconda Divisione club A.S. Andria BAT on another loan deal. He managed another 9 goals in 18 league appearances for the Italian side, before returning to Catania once again on 30 June 2009.

Colligiana
On 31 August 2009, the final day of the Italian summer transfer window, Di Cosmo was sold permanently to Tuscan Lega Pro Seconda Divisione outfit, V.F. Colligiana, without making a single appearance for Catania during his stint with the club.
Di Cosmo ironically formed an offensive partnership at Colligiana with former Catania teammate Christian Ianelli, and scored 9 goals in 22 league appearances during the 2009-10 Lega Pro Seconda Divisione season.

Return to South America
Following the 2009-10 season, Di Cosmo returned to South America, with Bolivian side, The Strongest, where he competed in the Liga de Fútbol Profesional Boliviano, and scored 11 goals in 34 league appearances. After just one season, he transferred out of Bolivia altogether, joining Angostura F.C. of Venezuela in 2011. His move was very short-lived, however, as he transferred to Peruvian outfit, FBC Melgar on 31 December 2011, after just 4 goals and 12 appearances in the Venezuelan Primera División. With Melgar, Di Cosmo earned a starting shirt once again, making 41 league appearances and scoring 11 goals in the process. On 31 December 2012, after just one year in the Peruvian Primera División, Di Cosmo returned to Bolivia with Oriente Petrolero on a free transfer. He has since scored 3 goals in 19 league appearances for his club.

FAS
Di cosmo joined Salvadoran club C.D. FAS .

References

External links
 

1984 births
Living people
Argentine footballers
Argentine expatriate footballers
Footballers from Santa Fe, Argentina
Argentine people of Italian descent
Association football forwards
Catania S.S.D. players
S.S. Fidelis Andria 1928 players
A.S.D. Olimpia Colligiana players
The Strongest players
FBC Melgar footballers
Oriente Petrolero players
Peruvian Primera División players
Expatriate footballers in Peru
Expatriate footballers in Italy
Expatriate footballers in Bolivia
Expatriate footballers in El Salvador
A.C.S.D. Saluzzo players